The Warrego burrowing snake (Antaioserpens warro) is a species of snake native to western Queensland.

References

Snakes of Australia
Endemic fauna of Australia
Antaioserpens